A kill file (also killfile, bozo bin or twit list) is a file used by some Usenet reading programs to discard articles matching some unwanted patterns of subject, author, or other header lines. Adding a person or subject to one's kill file means that person or topic will be ignored by one's newsreader in the future. By extension, the term may be used for a decision to ignore the person or subject in other media.

Kill files were first implemented in Larry Wall's rn. Sometimes more than one kill file will be used.  Some newsreader programs also allow the user to specify a time period to keep an author in the kill file.

Web-based forums, including at least some web-based Usenet portals, often have a similar but usually simpler feature called an ignore list, which hides any posts by a specific user, though typically without the ability to ignore posts for reasons other than the username of origin.

More advanced newsreader software like Gnus sometimes provides a more sophisticated form of filter known as scoring, where score files are maintained  which use fuzzy logic to apply arbitrarily complex overlapping sets of rules to score articles up or down, with articles being properly killed (ignored by the newsreader) only when their weighted score drops below a user-defined threshold. For example, articles might be score killed iff they violate too many low-weighted stylistic rules (e.g. containing too many capital letters or too little punctuation, implying an annoying reading experience), or only one or two highly-weighted rules (such as the body containing objectionable keywords or the origin being a known source of spam).

History
Jerry Pournelle wrote in 1986 of his wish for improvements to an offline reader for the Byte Information Exchange online service: "What I really need, though, is a program that will ... sort through the messages, assigning some to a priority file and others to the bit bucket depending on subject matter and origin".

Media
In William Gibson's novel Idoru, the virtual community Hak Nam is built around an "inverted killfile" and is modeled on Kowloon Walled City.

See also

Circular File
Email filtering
Shadow banning
Usenet Death Penalty

References

External links
 Kill file entry in the Jargon File
 Kill file definition entry at NewsDemon.com

Usenet